Richard Timothy Schadla-Hall,  (24 September 1947 – 9 January 2023) was a British archaeologist who specialised in the study of how the archaeological discipline interacts with the public. He was affiliated with the Institute of Archaeology at University College London in Bloomsbury, central London, where he worked as a Reader in Public Archaeology.

Life and career
Schadla-Hall was born on 24 September 1947. In 1971, Schadla-Hall gained his BA in archaeology from the University of Cambridge, before attaining his MA there in 1974. His first book, Tom Sheppard: Hull's Great Collector, was published in 1989.

From 1985 to 1997, Schadla-Hall and Paul Mellars co-directed an excavation of the Mesolithic settlement site of Star Carr in North Yorkshire; it had previously been excavated by Grahame Clark in the late 1940s and early 1950s.

Schadla-Hall was editor of the journal Public Archaeology  and a trustee of the veteran support charity Waterloo Uncovered, which conducts an annual excavation on the site of the Battle of Waterloo with veterans and serving personnel.

On 1 January 1990, Schadla-Hall was elected a Fellow of the Society of Antiquaries of London (FSA).

Schadla-Hall died on 9 January 2023, at the age of 75.

Bibliography

Books

References

External links
Schadla-Hall's staff page at UCL
Waterloo Uncovered

1947 births
2023 deaths
Academics of University College London
English archaeologists
People associated with the UCL Institute of Archaeology
Fellows of the Society of Antiquaries of London